The 2020 Manitoba Scotties Tournament of Hearts presented by Bayer, the provincial women's curling championship for Manitoba, was held from January 29 – February 2 at the Riverdale Community Centre in Rivers, Manitoba. The winning Kerri Einarson rink represented Manitoba at the 2020 Scotties Tournament of Hearts in Moose Jaw, Saskatchewan and won the championship title.

Qualification process

Teams
The teams are listed as follows:

Round-robin standings
Final round-robin standings

Round-robin results
All draws are listed in Central Time (UTC−06:00).

Draw 1
Wednesday, January 29, 9:30 am

Draw 2
Wednesday, January 29, 2:00 pm

Draw 3
Wednesday, January 29, 7:15 pm

Draw 4
Thursday, January 30, 9:30 am

Draw 5
Thursday, January 30, 2:00 pm

Draw 6
Thursday, January 30, 7:00 pm

Draw 7
Friday, January 31, 8:30 am

Draw 8
Friday, January 31, 12:15 pm

Draw 9
Friday, January 31, 4:00 pm

Draw 10
Friday, January 31, 7:45 pm

Championship Round

Standings
Final Championship Round Standings

Results

Draw 11
Saturday, February 1, 1:30 pm

Draw 12
Saturday, February 1, 6:00 pm

Playoffs

Semifinal
Sunday, February 2, 9:00 am

Final
Sunday, February 2, 4:00 pm

Notes

References

2020 in Manitoba
Curling in Manitoba
2020 Scotties Tournament of Hearts
January 2020 sports events in Canada